Euzois  (Greek: Εὐζώιος, died 154) was the bishop of Byzantium for six years (148–154). He succeeded Bishop Athenodorus. He was in office during the persecution of Christians by Emperor Antoninus Pius. His successor was Laurence.

Sources
 www.ec-patr.org

2nd-century Romans
2nd-century Byzantine bishops
Bishops of Byzantium
154 deaths
Year of birth unknown